Pau Vela Maggi (born 31 May 1986) is a Spanish-born Brazilian rower. He and Álex Sigurbjörnsson placed 13th in the men's coxless pair event at the 2016 Summer Olympics.

He competed for Spain up to and including 2018, but from 2019 he competed for Brazil.

See also 
 Rowing at the 2019 Pan American Games
 Xavier Vela

References

1986 births
Living people
Spanish male rowers
Brazilian male rowers
Spanish people of Brazilian descent
Olympic rowers of Spain
Rowers at the 2016 Summer Olympics
Mediterranean Games bronze medalists for Spain
Mediterranean Games medalists in rowing
Competitors at the 2013 Mediterranean Games
Pan American Games medalists in rowing
Pan American Games silver medalists for Brazil
Rowers at the 2019 Pan American Games
Medalists at the 2019 Pan American Games
Sportspeople from Ceuta
Sportspeople of Brazilian descent